Giorgio La Malfa (born 13 October 1939 in Milan) is an Italian politician.

Biography

La Malfa was born in Milan, the son of Ugo La Malfa, a long-time Italian political leader and minister.

La Malfa served as secretary of the Italian Republican Party from 1987 to 1993, when he stood down and was indicted to face trial over a corruption scandal. He returned to politics in 1994, and has since 2001 been president of the party. From 2001 to 2005 he was President of the Finances Commission of the Italian Chamber of Deputies. He was Italian minister for European Union Affairs from April 2005 until the elections of April 2006, when the centre-right coalition lost its majority; La Malfa was nonetheless elected to Parliament.
La Malfa was re-elected to the Chamber in the 2008 Italian general election with The People of Freedom,  but on 24 September 2009 he announced his detachment from the Berlusconi IV Cabinet through a letter published by Corriere della Sera.

On 8 June 2011 he was expelled from PRI by the party's college of arbitrators, for having voted against the Berlusconi Cabinet on 14 December 2010. He was readmitted into the party in March 2019.

Bibliography
Le innovazioni nella teoria dello sviluppo (1970)
L'Italia al bivio, ristagno o sviluppo (1985, with E. Grilli and P. Savona)
Le ragioni di una svolta (1992, with G. Turani)
L'Europa legata: i rischi dell'euro (2000)

References

External links
Official website

1939 births
Living people
Politicians from Milan
Italian Republican Party politicians
Italian politicians convicted of crimes
People of Sicilian descent
Criminals from Milan